Temur Oltiboevich Juraev (born 12 May 1984 in Toshkent) is an Uzbekistani football goalkeeper who currently plays for Shurtan Guzar.

Career
Juraev has spent most of his career playing for Pakhtakor. He played for Pakhtakor between from 2004 until 2013. In 2014, he moved to Lokomotiv Tashkent.
He played for the Uzbekistan national football team from 2006 until 2011.

Honours

Club
Pakhtakor
 Uzbek League (6): 2002, 2004, 2005, 2006, 2007, 2012
 Uzbek Cup (7): 2002, 2004, 2005, 2006, 2007, 2009, 2011
 CIS cup: 2007
 AFC Champions League semi-final (2): 2003, 2004

Lokomotiv
 Uzbek League runners-up (1): 2014
 Uzbek Cup (1): 2014
 Uzbekistan Super Cup runners-up (1): 2014

References

External links

 

Uzbekistani footballers
Uzbekistan international footballers
Pakhtakor Tashkent FK players
Living people
1984 births
2011 AFC Asian Cup players
Footballers at the 2010 Asian Games
Association football goalkeepers
Asian Games competitors for Uzbekistan